Nina Myral, stage name of Eugénie, Hortense Gruel, (26 June 1884 – 30 March 1975) was a 20th-century French actress, dancer and singer.

Filmography 
 1916: Paris pendant la guerre by Henri Diamant-Berger
 1917: Ils y viennent tous au cinéma by Henri Diamant-Berger
 1923: Gonzague by Henri Diamant-Berger : Pierrette
 1922: Le Mauvais Garçon by Henri Diamant-Berger: La bonne
 1931: Coiffeur pour dames by René Guissart : Mme Dupetit-Flageot
 1931: L'Indéfrisable by Jean de Marguenat, short film
 1932: Les Bleus de l'amour by Jean de Marguenat - La comtesse
 1932: Histoire de rire by Jean Boyer (short film) : La vieille cuisinière
 1932: Je vois ça d'ici / Un coup de téléphone by Jean Caret - short film
 1932: Quand monsieur voudra by Jean Marguerite - short film
 1932: La Saisie by Jean Marguerite, short film
 1933: Coralie et Cie by Alberto Cavalcanti - La tante Laure
 1933: A Man Has Been Stolen by Max Ophüls - La vieille dame
 1933: L'Accordeur by Henri Diamant-Berger, short film
 1934: Nous ne sommes plus des enfants by Augusto Genina
 1934: Le Prince Jean by Jean de Marguenat - Mme de Grivelles
 1935: Martha ou les Dernières roses by Karl Anton - La duchesse
 1936: L'Ange du foyer by Léon Mathot - Miss Watson
 1937: Le Fauteuil 47 by Fernand Rivers - Arsinöé, l'habilleuse
 1937: Maman Colibri by Jean Dréville - Mme de Saint-Puy
 1937: Le Compositeur du dessus by Paul Mesnier, short film
 1938: La Maison du Maltais by Pierre Chenal - L'épouse du collectionneur
 1938: Ma sœur de lait by Jean Boyer - Mlle Estève, la gouvernante
 1938: La Présidente by Fernand Rivers - Sophie
 1938: Visages de femmes by René Guissart - Mme Legrand
 1939: Marseille mes amours by Jacques Daniel-Norman - Tante Anna
 1939: Moulin rouge by André Hugon - La concierge
 1940: They Were Twelve Women by Georges Lacombe - La bonne
 1941: Patrouille blanche by Christian Chamborant - Mme Galvin
 1941: Le Valet maître by Paul Mesnier - Agathe
 1945: We Are Not Married by Bernard-Roland
 1945: Her Final Role by Jean Gourguet
 1946: Le Charcutier de Machonville by Vicky Ivernel - La marquise
 1946: La Kermesse rouge by Paul Mesnier - Éléonore de Saint-Aubin
 1948: L'Armoire volante by Carlo Rim - La première commère
 1948: The Ladies in the Green Hats by Fernand Rivers - Mlle de Valencourt
 1948: Cité de l'espérance by Jean Stelli - Mme Euridipe
 1948: Jo la Romance by Gilles Grangier - Mamita
 1949: The Atomic Monsieur Placido by Robert Hennion - La vieille dame
 1949: At the Grand Balcony by Henri Decoin - Mme Viard
 1949: Une nuit de noces by René Jayet - La présidente
 1949: Ronde de nuit by François Campaux - Une concierge
 1950: A Hole in the Wall by Émile Couzinet - La concierge
 1950: Justice Is Done by André Cayatte - La mère de béatrice
 1950: Mr. Peek-a-Boo by Jean Boyer - Mme Eloïse
 1950: The Prize by Jean Boyer - Mme de Goudreville
 1953: Carnaval by Henri Verneuil - La présidente des filles repenties
 1954: The Sheep Has Five Legs by Henri Verneuil - Justine, la bonne des Durand-Perrin
 1955: The French, They Are a Funny Race by Preston Sturges
 1955: People of No Importance by Henri Verneuil - Une employée chez Barchandeau
 1955: Je suis un sentimental by John Berry - La malade dans la chambre d’hôpital
 1955: Quatre jours à Paris by André Berthomieu - L'habilleuse
 1956: Mademoiselle et son gang by Jean Boyer - La bourgeoise qui emploie Agnès comme nurse
 1956: Nous autres à Champignol by Jean Bastia - Mlle Tintoret
 1956: La Terreur des dames ou Ce cochon de Morin by Jean Boyer
 1957: Sénéchal le magnifique by Jean Boyer - La souffleuse au théâtre
 1960: Boulevard by Julien Duvivier
 1962: The Devil and the Ten Commandments by Julien Duvivier - Une paroissienne, in the sketch: "Dieu en vain ne jureras"
 1963: That Man from Rio by Philippe de Broca

Theatre 
 1905: Tom Pitt, le roi des pickpockets by Victor de Cottens and Victor Darlay, Théâtre du Châtelet
 1936: Le Guéridon Empire by Rip, directed by Edmond Roze, Comédie des Champs-Élysées

External links 
 MYRAL (Nina) on ECMF (1918–1944)
 Nina MYRAL in Notre cinéma
 Nina Myral on UniFranceFilm.com
 

French female dancers
French film actresses
Actresses from Paris
1884 births
1975 deaths